Walter Beerli (23 July 1928 – 1995) was a Swiss football forward who played for Switzerland in the 1950 FIFA World Cup. He also played for BSC Young Boys.

Beerli died in 1995, at the age of 67.

References

1928 births
1995 deaths
Swiss men's footballers
Switzerland international footballers
Association football forwards
BSC Young Boys players
1950 FIFA World Cup players
FC Luzern players